Jaime Gavilán Martínez (born 12 May 1985) is a Spanish professional footballer who plays as a left midfielder for UD San Sebastián de los Reyes.

He amassed La Liga totals of 203 games and 11 goals over the course of 12 seasons, representing mainly in the competition Valencia and Getafe.

Club career

Valencia
Born in Valencia, Valencian Community, Gavilán was a Valencia CF youth product. He made his first-team – and La Liga – debut one month shy of his 18th birthday, playing 12 minutes in a 0–1 away defeat against Real Valladolid on 19 April 2003. He also spent two full seasons with the reserves, in the third division.

Gavilán was gradually breaking into the main squad after two loans (CD Tenerife – second level – and Getafe CF), even though he had to battle for that position with the gifted (although tremendously injury-prone) Vicente. However, after the arrival of new boss Ronald Koeman in November 2007, he was deemed surplus to requirements and was loaned again to Getafe, until the end of the season; the previous campaign, he suffered a serious knee ligament injury which kept him out of action for a period of six months.

In his second spell with the Madrid outskirts side, Gavilán appeared prominently during half a season, netting in a 2–1 home win over Racing de Santander on 16 March 2008. He was also part of the team's quarter-final run in the UEFA Cup, playing in three matches, all as a starter.

Getafe
On 15 July 2008, Gavilán signed a four-year deal with Getafe, thus losing all ties to Valencia. During his first full season he was an everpresent midfield fixture and, on 12 April 2009, he scored the game's only goal in an important win at Sevilla FC.

In 2009–10, Gavilán featured in 27 league games (no goals) as Getafe qualified for the second time ever for Europe, after finishing in sixth position. On 6 March 2011, in the last minutes of the first half of a 0–2 away defeat against Sporting de Gijón, he suffered the same injury to his knee, being sidelined for the rest of the campaign.

Levante
Free agent Gavilán joined fellow top division club Levante UD in June 2014, signing a two-year contract with an option to extend for a further year. On 30 January 2015, after appearing in only six competitive matches, he severed his link.

Abroad
After a brief spell in Greece with Platanias FC, Gavilán signed for Indian Super League side Atlético de Kolkata on 18 June 2015. Subsequently, he represented South Korea's Suwon FC before returning to India with Chennaiyin FC.

Alcorcón
On 6 July 2018, 33-year-old Gavilán returned to Spain after agreeing to a two-year contract with AD Alcorcón in the second division. On 9 July of the following year, after appearing in only eight league matches, he terminated his contract.

Sanse
On 10 August 2019 UD San Sebastián de los Reyes announced, that they had signed Gavilán.

International career
In the run up to the 2006 FIFA World Cup, Luis Aragonés called up Gavilán to a Spain senior team get-together, however he was ultimately not part of the squad at the finals and never earned a full cap.

Club statistics

Honours

Club
Chennaiyin
Indian Super League: 2017–18

International
Spain U19
UEFA European Under-19 Championship: 2004

Spain U16
UEFA European Under-16 Championship: 2001

Spain U20
FIFA U-20 World Cup: Runner-up 2003

References

External links

1985 births
Living people
Footballers from Valencia (city)
Spanish footballers
Association football midfielders
La Liga players
Segunda División players
Segunda División B players
Valencia CF Mestalla footballers
Valencia CF players
CD Tenerife players
Getafe CF footballers
Levante UD footballers
AD Alcorcón footballers
UD San Sebastián de los Reyes players
Super League Greece players
Platanias F.C. players
Indian Super League players
ATK (football club) players
Chennaiyin FC players
K League 1 players
Suwon FC players
Spain youth international footballers
Spain under-21 international footballers
Spanish expatriate footballers
Expatriate footballers in Greece
Expatriate footballers in India
Expatriate footballers in South Korea
Spanish expatriate sportspeople in Greece
Spanish expatriate sportspeople in India
Spanish expatriate sportspeople in South Korea